Ovidio Guzmán, better known by his stage name as Ovi, is a Cuban singer of Corrido, Reggaetón and Latin trap.

Biography 
He was born in Cuba. Since he was little, he was attracted to music, because when he was in school he formed a musical group with a group of friends, but they never had the opportunity to record any single. In his native Cuba he studied at the University of Medical Sciences of Havana, but he stopped studying due to financial problems and because his true passion was music, that's when he decided to leave Cuba for Ecuador and for that he had to sell his house and some personal belongings to in this way undertake a new trip to the United States with the desire to start his musical career, his destination was Miami. However, at the beginning of his arrival it did not go well for him since he did not have a job and could only survive as a kitchen assistant, after those times he ended up in drug addiction but he managed to recover, then he was in Arizona until he arrived in Los Angeles and He met the record label "Rancho Humilde", which opened the doors for him to be part of it.

He became known in the musical environment with the singles "Se me dio" and "Bailen" under the record label "Rancho humilde". But it was in 2019 when he began to have greater notoriety when he released the single "Cuando me ve" with the Mexican singer Adriel Favela. Then a few months later, the premiere of "Yo ya lo enrolé" with Natanael Cano, which was a success in several Latin American countries, especially in Mexico. In May of the same year, he released the single "Nadie como tú" with Carolina Ross, which reached more than 4 million views on YouTube just a few days after its premiere. On March 19, 2020, the Mexican rapper Natanael Cano premiered in collaboration with  Ovi  the single "Pacas Verdes" that in just one month got 20 million views on YouTube. The song also caught the attention of the rapper Bad Bunny, who congratulated them for the initiative to include the genre corridos tumbados. Finally, on April 20, Ovi released their first studio album called "Amen" that includes collaborations with Gera MX, Junior H and Natanael Cano.

A month later, he released the song “Vengo de nada”, with Natanael Cano, Alemán and Big Soto, which made it to the Hot Latin Songs Billboard chart in the United States. In October he released the album "Buen viaje", which includes songs produced by Teejay, Young Hollywood, Krizous and Junior H. The album makes references to the movie "Scarface", the program "Caso cerrado" and the song "Umbrella" by Rihanna.

In December 2020, he published his third studio album, “Las 3 torres”, in which Natanael Cano and Junior H participates.

References

Living people
Cuban male singer-songwriters
Cuban reggaeton musicians
Latin trap musicians
Year of birth missing (living people)